The French submarine Laplace (Q111) was a  built for the French Navy built between 1913 and 1919. It was laid down in the Arsenal de Rochefort shipyards and launched on 12 August 1919. Laplace was completed in 1921 and served in the French Marine Nationale until 1935.

Design
The Lagrange-class submarines were constructed as part of the French fleet's expansion programmes from 1913 to 1914. During construction, the idea of steam propulsion was abandoned and the ships were instead equipped with diesel engines.

Propulsion while surfaced was provided by two  diesel motors built by the Swiss manufacturer Sulzer and two  electric motors.

The ships were equipped with eight 450 mm torpedo tubes (four in the bow, two stern and two external), with a total of ten torpedoes, and two on-board guns. The class was also armed with a 75 mm gun with 440 shells. The crew consisted of four officers and forty-three seamen.

Service history
Laplace was built in the Arsenal de Rochefort. It was laid down in 1913 and launched on 12 August 1919, and completed in 1921. It was named in honor of the French astronomer and mathematician Pierre-Simon Laplace. From 1922 to 1923, Laplace underwent a major refit in which it received a new conning tower, bridge and periscope. Laplace served in the Mediterranean Sea until 1935.

References

Citations 
 
 
 
 
 

World War I submarines of France
Lagrange-class submarines
1919 ships